Ruslan Apostolov (Born November 22, 1989 in Sofia, Bulgaria) is a concert violinist who currently serves as Director and Professor of the Koart Academy of Music in Columbus, Georgia.

Biography 

Ruslan Apostolov began studying violin when he was five years old at the Lubomir Pipkov National Music School. He continued his studies at the Pancho Vladigerov National Music Academy in his hometown Sofia, under the tutelage of the renowned soloist Yosif Radionov. While in Bulgaria he was a winner of the 2011 Vasco Abadjiev International Violin Competition.

Following this he earned two graduate degrees (“Master of Interpretation” and “Master Soloist”) at the Haute Ecole de Musique in Lausanne, Switzerland with Israeli virtuoso Sergiu Schwartz. During his studies in Switzerland he won prizes in two competitions, the International Competition Musica Insieme (Italy), and the Mozart International Music Festival in Terni (Italy).

Most recently he graduated from the Schwob School of Music in Columbus, Georgia where he won the concerto competition in 2016. 
Additionally he has studied with Pavel Vernikov, Gerhard Shultz (second violinist of the Alban Berg Quartett), Bartolomiej Niziol (concertmaster of Zurich Opernhaus), Donk Suk Kang, and Gyorgy Pauk.

He has recorded professionally for Bulgarian National Radio and Television among other organizations.

Performances 
Ruslan Apostolov has been featured as a soloist alongside many orchestras including Orchestre de Chambre de Lausanne, Vidin Symphony Orchestra, Professional Academic Symphony Orchestra, Orpheus Chamber Orchestra, Razgrad Symphony Orchestra, Sliven Symphony Orchestra, CSU Philharmonic, and in CSU’s 2016 production of “Fiddler on the Roof”.

A frequent participant in music festivals, he has performed in several: Forum Valais (Switzerland), Schubertiade Fondation Wolff (Switzerland), Ill Music Festival and Master Class (Poland), Academy for Mastery (Bulgaria), and The Arts for the Earth (Bulgaria). He has played as a soloist in festivals including Sofia Music Weeks (Bulgaria), International Music Summer Academy “Prague, Vienna, Budapest” (Austria), International Youth Music Festival Competition (Bulgaria), Crescendo Summer Institute of the Arts (Hungary), and the Young Virtuoso Festival (Bulgaria).

Competition History 
2016 Winner of Concerto Competition – CSU “Schwob School of Music”( USA)
2013  Winner of the International Music Festival “Mozart Terni” (Italy)
2013 International Violin competition „Musica Insieme” (Italy) - First Prize
2011 International violin competition „Vasko  Abadjiev“- (Bulgaria)The special prize of the competition
2010 National chamber music competition (Bulgaria) - First Prize
2010 International music competition „Hopes, Talents, Masters“ Chamber Music edition (Bulgaria)  - Second prize
2010 National competition for instrumentalists and singers „Svetoslav Obretenov“ Chamber music division (Bulgaria )Third Prize
2009 Academic Violin Competition “Nicolo Paganini” (Bulgaria) - Third Prize
2007  International Competition “The Music and The Earth“ Chamber Music Division (Bulgaria )- Special Prize
2007  International Music Competition - „Hopes, Talents, Masters“ Violin Division –(Bulgaria) First Prize
2005 National violin competition „prof. Nedyalka Simeonova“ (Bulgaria) - Special Prize
2005 National violin competition „prof. Nedyalka Simeonova“  (Bulgaria) - Second Prize
2004 Winner of the International Summer Institute of the Arts “Crescendo” - (Hungary)

Recordings 

2012 Virtuoso Pieces for Violin and Piano for Bulgarian National Radio 
2016 Beyond Borders (Lausanne, Switzerland)
2016 Nordic Spirit at HEMU (Lausanne, Switzerland)
2018 Romantic Violin at CSU (Columbus, Georgia)

References

Bulgarian violinists
Male violinists
Columbus State University alumni
Lausanne Conservatory alumni
1989 births
Living people